Iglesia Evangelica Apostolica del Nombre de Jesus, also known as IEANJESUS, is the largest Ecuadorian and Peruvian Oneness Pentecostal denomination. Founded in 1959, it now counts more than 1022 churches in Ecuador, and over 350,000 members around the world.

The Jesus Name Evangelical Apostolic Church has churches and missions around the world such as Peru, Chile, Uruguay, Venezuela, San Salvador, Spain, Italy, Switzerland, Sweden, the Netherlands, Israel, Brazil, Dominican Republic, Costa Rica, Great Britain, Germany, Romania, Honduras, Bolivia.

External links
 Official site

Churches in Ecuador
Christian organizations established in 1969
Pentecostal denominations in South America
Oneness Pentecostal denominations
Pentecostal denominations established in the 20th century
Holiness denominations